Baptist Health System is a hospital and medical facility system located in San Antonio in the U.S. state of Texas.

History
In 1903 a group of 30 or more physicians, members of the young Bexar County Medical Society, together with about 30 business and professional men organized the San Antonio Associated Charities which built a four-story hospital on Dallas Street, the Physicians' and Surgeons' Hospital.

Today, Baptist Health System is a major healthcare provider in San Antonio and South Texas, the fourth largest civilian employer in San Antonio; and fully accredited by the  Joint Commission on the Accreditation of Healthcare Organizations (JCAHO). It is owned by Tenet Healthcare and affiliated with the Baptist General Convention of Texas.

Hospitals and facilities
Baptist Health System includes five acute-care hospitals which offer 1,673 licensed beds:
 Baptist Medical Center in Downtown San Antonio
 Mission Trail Baptist Hospital on the South Side
 North Central Baptist Hospital in the Stone Oak district
 Northeast Baptist Hospital on the eastern fringe of Uptown San Antonio
 St. Luke's Baptist Hospital in the Medical Center

The system also includes:
 Baptist Regional Children's Center
 Baptist Women's Health Center
 HealthLink wellness and fitness center
 Baptist M&S Imaging Centers
 Community health and wellness programs
 Ambulatory services
 Rehabilitation services
 Medical office buildings including the newly opened Westover Baptist Medical Building
 San Antonio AirLife air medical transport
 Baptist Health System School of Health Professions.

Accreditations and memberships
 Baptist Health System is fully accredited by the Joint Commission on the Accreditation of Healthcare Organizations (JCAHO).
 The Society of Chest Pain Centers has granted the designation of Accredited Chest Pain Center to each of the five hospitals in the Baptist Health System. Baptist Medical Center, Mission Trail Baptist Hospital, North Central Baptist Hospital, Northeast Baptist Hospital and St. Luke's Baptist Hospital received full accreditation status from the Accreditation Review Committee on November 3, 2005. They are the first, and currently only, Accredited Chest Pain Centers in San Antonio, and are among fewer than 180 in the nation.
 Baptist Health System laboratories are accredited by the College of American Pathologists.
 The Comprehensive Cancer Program of the Baptist Health System is accredited by the American College of Surgeons.
 Baptist M&S Imaging Centers and Baptist Health System imaging departments are accredited by the American College of Radiology.
 The Diabetes Self Management Course of Baptist Health System is Recognized by the American Diabetes Association.
 The inpatient Rehabilitation Centers at St. Luke's Baptist Hospital and Baptist Medical Center are accredited by the Commission on Accreditation of Rehabilitation Facilities.
 San Antonio AirLife is among an elite group of emergency transport services in the U.S. to earn re-accreditation from the Commission on Accreditation of Medical Transport Systems. AirLife, owned jointly by the Baptist Health System and the University Health System, is one of only about 100 transport programs in the nation to meet these standards.

References

Tenet Healthcare
Hospital networks in the United States
Healthcare in San Antonio
South Texas Medical Center